Christopher Tilghman is an American novelist and short story writer.

Life
He graduated from Yale University.  He served three years in the Navy. 
He worked at a sawmill in New Hampshire, moved back to Cambridge, Massachusetts.  He was a corporate copywriter and journalist.  He edited Ploughshares.
He lived with his wife and three sons in rural Massachusetts.

He teaches at University of Virginia
and the Napa Writers' Conference.

Awards
 1990 Whiting Award
 1993-1994 Guggenheim Fellowship
 Ingram Merrill Foundation Award

Works

Books
    (reprint 1991)
 
 
 
 
Thomas and Beal in the Midi. Farrar, Straus and Giroux, 2012. .

Stories
"Norfolk, 1969", Virginia Quarterly Review, Spring 1986 
"On the Rivershore", Virginia Quarterly Review, Spring 1989 
"Aerial Bombardment", Virginia Quarterly Review, "Writers on Writers," 2006

References

External links
Profile at The Whiting Foundation

20th-century American novelists
21st-century American novelists
American male novelists
Yale University alumni
University of Virginia faculty
Living people
American male short story writers
20th-century American short story writers
21st-century American short story writers
20th-century American male writers
21st-century American male writers
Novelists from Virginia
Year of birth missing (living people)